Vitaliy Moskalenko (born 30 June 1974) is a Russian triple jumper.

He competed at the 2003 World Championships and the 2004 Olympic Games without reaching the final.

His personal best jump is 17.17 metres, achieved in August 2003 in Tula.

References

1974 births
Living people
Russian male triple jumpers
Olympic male triple jumpers
Olympic athletes of Russia
Athletes (track and field) at the 2004 Summer Olympics
World Athletics Championships athletes for Russia
Russian Athletics Championships winners